The Farol de Câmara de Lobos is a small lighthouse on the south coast of the island of Madeira, Portugal. The lighthouse was built in 1937 on top of a promontory at a focal height of 23 metres, and is located about 7 km west of the city of Funchal.

See also

 List of lighthouses in Portugal

References

External links
 Picture of Câmara de Lobos Lighthouse

Lighthouses in Madeira
Lighthouses completed in 1937
Câmara de Lobos